Elhuyar is a surname. Notable people with the surname include:

Fausto Elhuyar (1755–1833), Spanish chemist, and the joint discoverer of tungsten with his brother Juan José Elhuyar in 1783
Juan José Elhuyar Lubize (1754–1796), Spanish chemist and mineralogist, who is best known for being first to isolate tungsten